Crooked Creek is a stream in Summit County, Utah, United States.

Crooked Creek was so named on account of its meandering course.

See also
List of rivers of Utah

References

Rivers of Summit County, Utah
Rivers of Utah